Rectus capitis posterior muscle may refer to:

Rectus capitis posterior minor muscle
Rectus capitis posterior major muscle